Iris Wolves (born 9 May 1994) is a Dutch water polo player for Polar Bears and the Dutch national team.

She participated at the 2018 Women's European Water Polo Championship.

References

1994 births
Living people
Dutch female water polo players
Water polo players at the 2020 Summer Olympics
Olympic water polo players of the Netherlands
World Aquatics Championships medalists in water polo
21st-century Dutch women